Nabrit is a surname. Notable people with the surname include:

James Nabrit III (1932–2013), African American civil rights attorney, son of James Nabrit Jr.
James Nabrit Jr. (1900–1997), African-American civil rights attorney
Samuel M. Nabrit (1905–2003), African-American educator